Gladys del Carmen Marín Millie (July 16, 1938 – March 6, 2005) was a Chilean activist and political figure. She was Secretary-General of the Communist Party of Chile (PCCh) (1994–2002) and then president of the PCCh until her death. She was a staunch opponent of General Augusto Pinochet and filed the first lawsuit against him, in which she accused him of committing human rights violations during his seventeen-year dictatorship.

Early life

Marín was born in Curepto, in the Maule region to Heraclio Marín, a farmer,  and school teacher Adriana Millie, later moving with her family to Sarmiento, and then to Talagante. At the age of eleven she settled in Santiago.

Political activism

Marín joined the Communist party while studying at pedagogy faculty in Santiago.
She was elected to the Chamber of Deputies in 1965, and again in 1970, representing a working-class district of Santiago.

Following the 1973 coup d'état, Marín first went underground and then, at the PCCh's insistence, took refuge in the Dutch embassy in Santiago, where she remained for eight months before being allowed to leave the country to East Germany. Her husband Jorge Muñoz disappeared in 1976, while Marín was out of the country, travelling in Costa Rica. She returned to Chile, clandestinely, in 1978 and fought from the underground for the return of democracy.

In 1997, Marín ran for a seat in the Senate and obtained the eighth largest national majority, but was not elected due to the nature of the Chilean electoral system, which favours the two dominant parties or coalitions. She ran for president in 1999 and achieved less than four percent of the vote, mainly due to fear from leftist voters that the right-wing candidate Joaquín Lavín could defeat Socialist Ricardo Lagos.

On January 12, 1998, Marín filed a complaint — the first person in Chile to do so — against Augusto Pinochet, accusing him of genocide, kidnapping, illicit association and illegal inhumation.

In August 2000, Marín attended the Third Al Mathaba Conference, held by the Al-Mathaba World Anti-Imperialist Centre, a centre in Libya established by Libyan leader Muammar Gaddafi for supporting anti-imperialist and leftist revolutionaries worldwide, as the representative of the PCCh, whose erstwhile anti-Pinochet armed wing, the Manuel Rodríguez Patriotic Front, had received support from Libya and its leader.

Personal life and death

Marín married Jorge Muñoz Poutays in 1963, with whom she had two children.
Marín died of brain cancer after a long battle which included treatment in Cuba and Sweden. Upon her death the government declared two days of national mourning. In accordance with her wishes, her coffin was exhibited at the former National Congress in Santiago and was viewed by thousands of mourners prior to its cremation. For her funeral the PCCh and her family organized a march through the center of Santiago, with estimates in the press ranging from "tens of thousands of marchers" to "over 200,000 people" to "almost one million people". An avenue crossing a working class district of Santiago was later renamed after her.

References

External links

 'Gladys Marín special from 'La Tercera'' (in Spanish)
 Declaration of period of mourning
 Presidential statement on the death of Gladys Marín (in Spanish)

1941 births
2005 deaths
People from Talca Province
Chilean people of Spanish descent
Chilean people of French descent
Communist Party of Chile politicians
Deputies of the XLV Legislative Period of the National Congress of Chile
Deputies of the XLVI Legislative Period of the National Congress of Chile
Deputies of the XLVII Legislative Period of the National Congress of Chile
Candidates for President of Chile
Women members of the Chamber of Deputies of Chile
20th-century Chilean women politicians
Chilean schoolteachers
Chilean exiles
Chilean expatriates in East Germany
Deaths from brain tumor
Deaths from cancer in Chile